Alison Kabush (born 2 August 1980) is a Canadian boccia player. She's won two bronze medals at the 2000 Paralympic Games and 2004 Paralympic Games.

Career
Kabush grew up in Surrey, British Columbia and began playing Boccia with the provincial team at the age of 13. She competed in her first Paralympics during the 2000 Paralympic Games, where she won a bronze medal. Kabush was later named to Team Canada's Paralympic team prior to the 2004 Paralympic Games and won a bronze medal with partner Paul Gauthier. In 2011, Kabush was selected to compete at the Boccia World Cup. She was inducted into the Canadian Cerebral Palsy Sports Association's Hall of Fame in 2019.

References

1980 births
Living people
Sportspeople from Vancouver
Sportspeople from Surrey, British Columbia
Paralympic boccia players of Canada
Paralympic bronze medalists for Canada
Boccia players at the 2000 Summer Paralympics
Boccia players at the 2004 Summer Paralympics
Medalists at the 2000 Summer Paralympics
Medalists at the 2004 Summer Paralympics